Islam Ðugum (born 1 June 1960) is a retired Bosnian long-distance runner. He competed in the men's marathon at the 1996 Summer Olympics.

References

External links
 

1960 births
Living people
People from Tomislavgrad
Athletes (track and field) at the 1996 Summer Olympics
Bosnia and Herzegovina male long-distance runners
Bosnia and Herzegovina male marathon runners
Olympic athletes of Bosnia and Herzegovina
Olympic male marathon runners